Adenopterus is a genus of crickets belonging to the tribe Podoscirtini recorded from the Pacific Islands.

Species
GBIF includes:
Adenopterus admirandus 
Adenopterus agrammus 
Adenopterus amiensis 
Adenopterus baloghi 
Adenopterus bimaculatus 
Adenopterus caledonicus 
Adenopterus confixus 
Adenopterus crouensis 
Adenopterus dubius 
Adenopterus dumbeus 
Adenopterus euperplexus 
Adenopterus incertus 
Adenopterus kraussi 
Adenopterus lifouensis 
Adenopterus meridionalis 
Adenopterus norfolkensis 
Adenopterus octolineatus 
Adenopterus paraperplexus 
Adenopterus perplexus 
Adenopterus roseola 
Adenopterus rouxi 
Adenopterus sarasini 
Adenopterus sarrameus 
Adenopterus saussurei 
Adenopterus sylvaticus 
Adenopterus tchambicus 
Adenopterus yahouensis

References

Crickets